"Alaska" is the third episode of the sixth season of the post-apocalyptic horror television series Fear the Walking Dead, which aired on AMC on October 25, 2020, in the United States.

This episode was directed by Colman Domingo who plays Victor Strand, marking his third episode as a director. This episode also marks the first Fear the  Walking Dead appearance of Christine Evangelista as Sherry, who is credited as a series regular. Evangelista is the third actor from The Walking Dead to join the cast of Fear the Walking Dead; she last appeared in the seventh season of the original series.

Plot 
In a flashback, Morgan is seen bringing supplies to Rachel and while they chat, Morgan begins to fuse his weapon with the axe of the deceased bounty hunter. In the present, Al and Dwight are inspecting what used to be a doctor's office. Al suddenly begins to hear voices on the radio and realizes that Isabelle is talking, Dwight finds a couple of beers and they both start drinking. During their talk, Al decides to hide her knowledge of Isabelle's proximity. Dwight overhears radio call signals and questions the keywords they are talking about. Al doesn't want to share anything, but Dwight realizes that the codename was that of Al's girl. Al finally admits that she is listening to Isabelle. Dwight encourages Al to head to "Drop Site Baker" to meet up with Isabelle.

They head to the tower and note spray paint on the wall reading "THE END IS THE BEGINNING", which Al scoffs at. Rats are encountered in the building and people appear to be infected by the bubonic plague. Al and Dwight head to the roof to await the helicopter drop. Dwight begins questioning Al about what she's going to do when she finds Isabelle, while Dwight, conversely, believes he will never find Sherry, his wife. Dwight believes he has been infected with the plague, and Al blames herself for bringing Dwight along.

Moments later, Al heads to the roof alone to wait for the helicopter to arrive. Al sets off a flare and radios the helicopter to turn away due to the plague. Isabelle recognizes Al's voice and the helicopter turns around, following the dropping of the package. Isabelle declares that the location has been "burned out" and moves on. Al finds the supplies that were left behind, including the medicine that Dwight and the other infected people need to treat the plague. She hands them over to Dwight, happily. Al heads back into the building and finds cans of spray paint near the rat cages. She believes that someone planted the rats to spread the plague here.

Dwight wants to go check in so the Rangers don't start asking questions. Al turns on the radio and someone asks if anyone is in trouble on the roof. Dwight takes the radio and begins to speak, and realizes that it is Sherry. When he leaves the building, they both meet and kiss.

Reception

Critical response 
David S.E. Zapanta of Den of Geek! rated the episode 5 out 5 stars, writing, "we may only be three episodes in, but I’m really enjoying season 6 so far. Sure, maybe it’s the prolonged cabin fever talking—we are seven months into a pandemic, after all. Or maybe Fear the Walking Dead has finally hit its stride." Erik Kain of Forbes praised the episode and wrote: "Fear The Walking Dead continues to be better than it was last season and through most of Season 4, but its creators are having a hard time shedding some of their worst habits."

Ratings 
The episode was seen by 1.50 million viewers in the United States on its original air date, below the previous episodes.

References

External links

 "Alaska" at AMC.com
 

2020 American television episodes
Fear the Walking Dead (season 6) episodes